The 1935 Michigan State Normal Hurons football team represented Michigan State Normal College (later renamed Eastern Michigan University) during the 1935 college football season. In their 14th season under head coach Elton Rynearson, the Hurons compiled a record of 4–2–2 and outscored their opponents by a combined total of 43 to 41. Robert W. Jarosch and Homer H. Parker were the team captains.  The team played its home games at Normal Field on the school's campus in Ypsilanti, Michigan.

Schedule

References

Michigan State Normal
Eastern Michigan Eagles football seasons
Michigan State Normal Hurons football